Lorena Franco (born 1983) is a Spanish model, actress, and writer. She has acted in more than 35 short films and 6 films in Spain and in popular TV series such as El secreto de Puente Viejo and Gavilanes, among others. She has been the face of various advertising brands nationally and internationally. She is also known for her music videos and Internet series. She combines her career as an actress with writing, with eleven titles published on Amazon.com. Her books have been translated internationally in several languages.

Acting career

References

External links 
 Lorena Franco official website

1983 births
Spanish female models
Spanish film actresses
Spanish television actresses
Living people
21st-century Spanish actresses